The Marvelous Misadventures of Flapjack is an American animated television series created by Thurop Van Orman for Cartoon Network. The series centers on Flapjack, voiced by Van Orman, an aspiring young sailor raised by Bubbie the whale and mentored by the grisly ex-pirate Captain K'nuckles. Flapjack, K'nuckles, and Bubbie reside in Stormalong Harbor, where they are always in search of the elusive Candied Island. While in Stormalong Harbor, Flapjack and company are surrounded by a cast of recurring characters that include Peppermint Larry, the owner of a candy store; Doctor Julius Barber, Stormalong's doctor and barber; Dock Hag, the law enforcement officer; Sally Syrup, a young girl who sells seashells; and Eight-Armed Willy, an octopus with a secret stash of candy.

The Marvelous Misadventures of Flapjack ran for 46 episodes across three seasons (90 episode segments). Originally airing in 2007 as a series of five animated shorts and later as a set of pilots, Flapjack premiered as a full series on June 5, 2008, with the episode "Several Leagues Under the Sea". Its ran continued for three seasons until the series finale, "Fish Out of Water", premiered on August 31, 2010.

Series overview

Episodes

Shorts (2007)
These shorts were shown as part of Cartoon Network's Wedgies  in 2008, and have a shorter length (about five minutes) than a standard episode (about 22 minutes, without commercials).

Pilot and "Captain and ToeNeil"
"Captain and ToeNeil" is the name incorrectly used for the pilot short that was supposed to originally air as part of Cartoon Network's Wedgies. After it was canceled it was advertised as a bonus feature on the Flapjack, Volume 1 DVD; however, it was not on the DVD when it was released. Series creator Thurop Van Orman later asserted that "Captain and ToeNeil" was a regular short and not the pilot. A short clip of the pilot was shown during an interview with Thurop on Cartoonnetwork.com. , "Captain and ToeNeil" has only aired in France, the UK, and Poland during commercial breaks.

Season 1 (2008–09)
The first season of 20 episodes officially premiered with "Several Leagues Above the Sea/Eye Sea You" on June 5, 2008, and ended with "Diamonds in the Stuff/TeeHee Tummy Tums" on March 26, 2009. The segment "That's a Wrap" aired as a sneak peek on May 26, 2008. "Candy Cruise Blues", and "My Guardian Angel is Killing Me!!/Dear Diary" were shown on Comcast On Demand several months before their actual air dates. This is the longest season of the show with each half-hour episode containing 2 11-minute segments.

Season 2 (2009–10)
Season two (also consisting of 20 episodes) began on July 30, 2009, with "Jar She Blows!/Behind the Curtain", and ended on June 28, 2010, with "A Day without Laughter". The Christmas special, "Low Tidings", aired on December 3, 2009. "Come Home Cap'n/Fastest Man Alive" and "Oh, You Animal!/The Return of Sally Syrup", were shown on Comcast On Demand several months before their actual air dates. This season has a total of 38 episode segments.

Season 3 (2010)
The third and final season of Flapjack began on July 5, 2010, with "Careful What You Fish For/Mayor May Not", and ended on August 31, 2010, with "Catch Me If You Candy/Fish Out of Water". Series creator Thurop Van Orman and his son Leif Van Orman guest-starred as live action K'nuckles and Flapjack in the series finale. This is the shortest season of the series, counting only 6 half-hour episodes. Each episode contains two 11-minute segments like the first season.

Notes

References

Lists of Cartoon Network television series episodes
Marvelous Misadventures of Flapjack
The Marvelous Misadventures of Flapjack